Naplanum was the first independent king of the ancient Near Eastern city-state of Larsa ca. 1961 BC to 1940 BC (short chronology) — roughly during the reign of Ibbi-Sin of the Third dynasty of Ur and the great famine — according to the later Larsa King List. No contemporary year names or inscriptions have been found verifying that Naplanum was a king of Larsa, which seems to have remained part of Ibbi-Sin's kingdom. However a prominent and wealthy Amorite merchant named Naplanum does appear in many sales records of the grain industry during these later days of the Third Dynasty, who may well have been the ancestor of the later independent kings of Larsa.

See also

Chronology of the ancient Near East

Notes

Amorite kings
20th-century BC Sumerian kings
Kings of Larsa
20th-century BC people